Grzegorz Jan Matuszak (8 January 1941 – 13 September 2022) was a Polish politician. A member of the Democratic Left Alliance, he served in the Senate of Poland from 2001 to 2005.

Matuszak died on 13 September 2022, at the age of 81.

References

1941 births
2022 deaths
Members of the Senate of Poland 2001–2005
Democratic Left Alliance politicians
University of Łódź alumni
Academic staff of the University of Łódź
Polish sociologists
Politicians from Łódź